Toktogul Airport  is an airport outside Toktogul, an urban-type settlement in Toktogul District of Jalal-Abad Province (oblast) of Kyrgyzstan. The Russian IATA code for Toktogul Airport is ТГЛ.

Toktogul Airport started its operations in the 1950s to serve the transportation needs of the engineers of the nearby Toktogul Hydroelectric Power Plant. The current runway was built in the 1970s. The airport has no terminal, and has no instrument landing facilities and operates only during daylight hours.

Until the 1990s, the airport had flights to Jalal-Abad (Jalal-Abad—Toktogul—Talas), Osh (Osh—Jalal-Abad—Toktogul—Talas) and Talas (Talas—Toktogul—Jalal-Abad).

References

External links 
 http://www.ourairports.com/airports/KG-0003/pilot-info.html

Airports in Kyrgyzstan
Airports built in the Soviet Union